Aglaia glabrata is a species of plant in the family Meliaceae. Aglaia glabrata is native to Brunei, Indonesia, and Malaysia.

References

glabrata
Near threatened plants
Taxonomy articles created by Polbot